Piety aka  is a 2022 Spanish-Argentine film directed and written by Eduardo Casanova which stars Ángela Molina and Manel Llunell as Libertad and Mateo in a mother-son toxic relationship. It has been variously billed as a drama, "mother-son horror", and black comedy. It displays camp elements.

Plot 
Set in 2011, the fiction concerns the toxic mother-son relationship established between Libertad (the mother) and Mateo (the son), formulating an analogy with the relationship of the North-Korean government with its populace. The maternal bond is upended by Mateo's cancer diagnosis.

Cast

Production 
Ana Belén was the original cast choice for the role of Libertad but she was eventually replaced by Ángela Molina due to the former's stage commitments. A Spanish-Argentine co-production, the film was produced by Pokeepsie Films, Gente Seria AIE, Spal Films, Link-up and Crudo Films. Filming began on 27 September 2021. Shooting locations included Madrid and Andalusia. It was shot with dialogue in Spanish and Korean.

Release 
The film premiered at 56th Karlovy Vary International Film Festival on 3 July 2022, screened as part of the 'Proxima' lineup. It also screened at the 26th Bucheon International Fantastic Film Festival (BiFan). It was later selected for the Montreal-based Fantasia International Film Festival. It had its US premiere at the Austin-based Fantastic Fest and also made it to the 55th Sitges Film Festival official selection slate. Distributed by Barton Films, it was theatrically released in Spain on 13 January 2023.

Reception 
Mary Beth McAndrews of Dread Central rated the film 4 out of 5 stars, assessing that Casanova manages to deliver "an upsettingly relevant and inherently queer message about relationships between mother and child".

J. Hurtado of Screen Anarchy wrote that "tragicomic to an extreme perhaps only comparable to the best work of Todd Solondz", the film is "gorgeously vulgar and shocking, a film that draws from many to create something absolutely unique".

Accolades 

|-
| align = "center" rowspan = "3" | 2022 || 56th Karlovy Vary International Film Festival || colspan = "2" | Proxima Special Jury Prize ||  || align = "center" | 
|-
| 26th Fantasia International Film Festival || colspan = "2" | Silver Audience Award for Best International Feature ||  || 
|-
| 17th Fantastic Fest || colspan = "2" | Best Picture (Official Competition) ||  || align = "center" | 
|-
| align = "center" rowspan = "8" | 2023 || 10th Feroz Awards || colspan = "2" | Arrebato Award (Fiction) ||  || align = "center" | 
|-
| rowspan = "3" | 30th Festival international du film fantastique de Gérardmer || colspan = "2" | Grand Prize ||  || rowspan = "3" | 
|-
| colspan = "2" | Young Jury Prize || 
|-
| colspan = "2" | Public Prize || 
|-
| 2nd Carmen Awards || Best Actress || Ángela Molina ||  || 
|-
| rowspan = "3" | 37th Goya Awards || Best Art Direction || Melanie Antón ||  || rowspan = "3" | 
|-
| Best Costume Design || Suevia Sampelayo || 
|-
| Best Makeup and Hairstyles || Sarai Rodríguez, Raquel González, Óscar del Monte ||  
|}

See also 
 List of Spanish films of 2023

References 

Films shot in Madrid
Films shot in Andalusia
Spanish drama films
Argentine drama films
2020s Spanish-language films
Pokeepsie Films films
2020s Spanish films
Films set in 2011
Films about cancer
Spanish black comedy films
Argentine black comedy films
Spanish horror films
Argentine horror films
2020s Argentine films
Films about mother–son relationships